The canton of Calais-Est is a former canton situated in the department of the Pas-de-Calais and in the Nord-Pas-de-Calais region of northern France. It was disbanded following the French canton reorganisation which came into effect in March 2015. It had a total of 24,112 inhabitants (2012).

Geography 
The canton is organised around Calais in the arrondissement of Calais. The altitude varies from 0m to 18m in Calais for an average altitude of 5m.

The canton comprised 2 communes:
Calais (partly)
Marck

See also 
Cantons of Pas-de-Calais 
Communes of Pas-de-Calais 
Arrondissements of the Pas-de-Calais department

References

Former cantons of Pas-de-Calais
Canton of Calais Est
2015 disestablishments in France
States and territories disestablished in 2015